Akhkula is a village in Georgia’s Kvemo Kartli region with the population of 86. It had 150 inhabitants in 2002.

Demography

References

Populated places in Marneuli Municipality